Salary packaging (also known as salary sacrifice or salary exchange) is the inclusion of employee benefits (also called fringe benefits) in an employee remuneration package in exchange for giving up part of monetary salary. Such arrangements are entered into most commonly if there are tax or other benefits to be derived by the employer or employee from the arrangement.

Salary sacrifice in the United Kingdom
In the United Kingdom, employee benefits commonly included in salary sacrifice arrangements are pension contributions, childcare vouchers, annual leave, etc. If correctly structured, the arrangement can benefit both parties as it saves them both NI contributions as well as save the employee income tax.

Salary sacrifice can be extended to any range of benefits and has becoming increasingly popular in the public sector as well as for transport related benefits e.g. Cycles, Bus Travel, Low CO2 emission cars, and more recently in 2020 vehicle maintenance. Salary sacrifice is also commonly used to fund the introduction of Flexible Benefit Plans in the UK.

Salary packaging in Australia

Contrary to popular belief, provisions in the FBT (Fringe Benefits Tax) act allow for the employees of private companies to utilise.

Items commonly salary packaged include:
 vehicles (either a company car or through a novated lease)
 mobile phones
 laptop computers

Some companies also allow their employees to salary package other items, including household utility bills, although this is complicated and normally requires the assistance of a third-party company who specialise in salary packaging arrangements. Salary packaged benefits in Australia generally attract Fringe Benefits Tax within the Australian taxation system, with a few exceptions - some benefits are Fringe Benefits Tax exempt, including mobile phones and laptop computers if used for work purposes.

Charities and public not for profit hospitals can do this most effectively as they are exempt from fringe benefits tax up to a certain limit per employee (from 1 April 2014 the amounts are $9,010 for Not-for-Profit Public Hospitals and $15,900 for Public Benevolent Institutions).  Additional benefits can be packaged above these limits through novated leasing, meals and entertainment or venue hire (holiday accommodation) as well as personal superannuation contributions subject to Concessional Contributions Caps.

The Australian Salary Packaging Industry Association  is the professional body for outsourced salary packaging service providers.

The Australian Taxation Office administers Fringe Benefits Tax and the FBT Exemptions that facilitate salary packaging for employees of not-for-profit healthcare organisations and public benevolent institutions.

The Federal Government delivered its 2015/2016 Budget on 12 May 2015. The Budget included proposed changes to the Meal Entertainment and Holiday Accommodation/Venue Hire benefits with an introduction of an annual Capped amount.

Therefore, the proposed changes apply to employees of Public Hospitals and not-for-profit FBT-exempt employers.

Proposed changes are to be effective from 1 April 2016, where these salary packaging Exempt benefits will be capped at $2,550 per FBT year (i.e. a $5,000 grossed up cap divided by the type 2 gross-up rate of 1.9608).

The long-awaited FBT exemption for electric vehicles passed through the Senate in Dec 2022. This move is part of a broader plan by the Government to increase the adoption rates of EVs in Australia, which are among the lowest in the developed world.

References

Taxation in Australia
Tax avoidance
Packaging
Employment in Australia